Ela Aydin (born 12 January 1999) is a German taekwondo athlete. Her greatest achievements are a bronze medal at the 2022 Grand Prix in Paris and two bronze medals at European Championships.

Career history

Junior 

Ela Aydin began practicing taekwondo at the age of five and competed in her first competition at age six. When she was 14, she was selected to represent the German national team at her first U15 European Championship in Bucharest, where she won a bronze medal. 

In the years following, she took part in several competitions such as the taekwondo Youth World Championships and several European Championships. In 2016, Aydin tore a cruciate ligament in her knee and therefore had to take a break from competing.

In 2017, Aydin won a silver medal at the U21 European Championships in Sofia.

Senior 

After winning the bronze medal at the Junior European Championships, Aydin started competing at the senior level in 2017. In 2018, she participated in the European Championships in Kazan but lost in the prelims against the eventual European Champion Kristina Tomić from Croatia. She also competed in the Grand Prix series of 2018.

Aydin continued her career by winning a bronze medal at the 2019 Military World Games in Wuhan and a silver medal at the 2019 Extra European Championships in Bari. In both competitions, she competed in the Olympic weight class of -49 kilograms. She also participated in the 2019 World Championships in Manchester, where she finished in ninth place, as well as the 2019 European Championships and two Grand Prix competitions.

In early 2021, Aydin won a bronze medal at the European Championships in Sofia. A few months later, she narrowly missed out on qualifying for the Olympics, losing to Israeli fighter Avishag Semberg in the semifinals of the tournament. Qualifying for the final would have meant being allowed to participate in the Olympic Games in Tokyo.

In September 2022, Ela Aydin won a bronze medal at the Paris Grand Prix - she is the first woman of the German national team to have won a medal at a Grand Prix competition.

Personal life 

In 2017, Aydin graduated from school with a General Certificate of Secondary Education. In the same year, she joined the sports promotion group of the Bundeswehr (German: Sportfördergruppe der Bundeswehr) and completed her basic training by the start of 2018. She has been an Soldier-Athlete (German: Sportsoldat) ever since.

References 

1999 births
Living people
German female taekwondo practitioners
European Taekwondo Championships medalists
21st-century German women